Guatapanal is a town in the Valverde Province Provinces of the Dominican Republic of the Dominican Republic.

Sources 
 – World-Gazetteer.com

Populated places in Valverde Province